Richfield is an unincorporated community in Fayette County, Iowa, United States.

Notes

Unincorporated communities in Fayette County, Iowa
Unincorporated communities in Iowa